Praed may refer to

People
Cyril Mackworth-Praed (1891–1974), British Olympic athlete
Herbert Mackworth-Praed (1841–1921), British landowner, magistrate, banker, benefactor and Conservative politician
Winthrop Mackworth Praed (1802–1839), British politician and poet
William Mackworth Praed (1694–1752), English lawyer and politician
Bulkley Praed (1799-1876), English cricketer
James Praed (died 1687), English politician
James Praed (died 1706),  English politician
John Praed (c. 1657–1717), English merchant and politician
Michael Praed (born 1960), British actor
Rosa Campbell Praed (1851–1935), Australian writer
William Praed (1747–1833), English businessman, banker and politician

Places
Praed Street in London
Praed Point in Papua New Guinea
Praed Point Battery, an artillery battery

Other
A Praed Street Dossier, a collection of stories by August Derleth